Michael & George: Feinstein Sings Gershwin is a 1998 album by American vocalist Michael Feinstein of songs composed by George Gershwin. It was Feinstein's third album of Gershwin's music, following Pure Gershwin (1987) and Nice Work If You Can Get It: Songs by the Gershwins (1996).

Reception

The Allmusic review by Rodney Batdorf awarded the album two stars, yet, somewhat incongruent with this rating, also said the album is "a joyous, irresistible album illustrating that not only is Feinstein's knowledge of Gershwin deep, but also that he knows how to keep the music alive with fresh, vibrant performances and arrangements".

Track listing
 "Embraceable You" - 4:39
 "Nobody but You" (Buddy DeSylva, Arthur Jackson) - 3:52
 "Love Is Here to Stay" - 4:10
 "Do It Again" (DeSylva) - 4:23
 "Of Thee I Sing" - 3:47
 "Funny Face" - 2:50
 "Lonely Boy" (DuBose Heyward) - 4:11
 "Shall We Dance?" - 3:41
 "Oh, Gee! Oh, Joy!" (P. G. Wodehouse) - 3:10
 "Delishious" - 5:25
 "I'll Build a Stairway to Paradise" (DeSylva) - 3:20
 "Love Walked In" - 4:36
 "Comes the Revolution" - 0:57
 "Soon" - 3:19
 "Swanee" (Irving Caesar)

All music composed by George Gershwin, and all lyrics written by Ira Gershwin. Other lyricists indicated.

Personnel
Michael Feinstein - vocals, arranger, piano, liner notes
David Tobocman - arranger, engineer, producer, programming, synthesizer orchestration
Bruce Roberts - arranger, producer, programming, background vocals
Chuck Berghofer - double bass
Adrian Rosen
Albie Berk - drums
Mike Fletcher
Gary Foster - flute, alto flute, alto saxophone
Jim Fox - guitar
Frederico Ramos
Stan Freeman - piano
Novi Novog - viola
Arnold McCuller - background vocals

References

Concord Records albums
Michael Feinstein albums
1998 albums